In the Night is the third studio album by American R&B singer and songwriter Cheryl Lynn, released on Columbia Records in April 1981. The album includes the hit Soul/dance track "Shake It Up Tonight" which reached to number five on both the Soul and Dance charts. In The Night was later certified Gold by the Recording Industry Association of America (RIAA) a month after its release.

Critical reception

In The Night received favorable reviews from critics.

Track listing
 "Shake It Up Tonight" – 5:41 (Michael and Brenda Sutton)
 "Show You How" – 4:06 (Cheryl Lynn, John Barnes, Linda Booth)
 "In the Night" – 4:27 (Ray Parker Jr.)
 "Hurry Home" – 4:22 (Lynn, Greg Jackson)
 "I'm on Fire" – 4:22 (Parker Jr.)
 "With Love on Our Side" – 4:21 (Parker Jr., Kamau Peterson)
 "If You'll Be True to Me" – 4:06 (Lynn, Parker Jr.)
 "What's on Your Mind" – 4:06 (Lynn, George Dream)
 "Baby" – 4:21 (Lynn, Parker Jr.)

Personnel
 Cheryl Lynn - vocals
 Arnell D. Carmichael, J.D. Nicholas, Sharon Jack - backing vocals
 Ray Parker Jr. - guitars, bass guitar, keyboards, synthesizers, drums, percussion
 Greg Moore, Wah Wah Watson, David T. Walker - guitars
 John Barnes, George Dream, Greg Jackson, Michael Boddicker, Michael Sutton, Darren Carmichael - keyboards, synthesizers
 Sylvester Rivers - piano, synthesized bass
 Marcus Miller, Scott Edwards, Allen McGrier - bass
 George F. Mitchell, James Gadson, Larry Tolbert - drums
 Ollie E. Brown - percussion
 Strings arranged by Gene Page

Charts

Singles

References

External links
 In the Night at Discogs

1981 albums
Cheryl Lynn albums
Columbia Records albums
Albums arranged by Gene Page
Albums produced by Ray Parker Jr.